Abshur (also Romanized as Ābshūr) is a village in Kheyrabad Rural District, in the Central District of Kharameh County, Fars Province, Iran. At the 2006 census, its population was 1,169, in 272 families.

References 

Populated places in Kharameh County